Wilhelm Przeczek (7 April 1936 in Karviná – 10 July 2006 in Třinec) was a Polish teacher, poet, writer, and activist from Zaolzie region of Cieszyn Silesia. He is considered one of the most important Polish writers of his generation from Zaolzie.

Przeczek was born to a coal miner's family. He studied at a teachers' seminary in Orlová and then at a college in Prague. He worked as a teacher in Polish schools in Zaolzie, e.g. in Jablunkov. Przeczek was later briefly a journalist for the Głos Ludu newspaper. He was also an activist within the PZKO (Polish Cultural and Educational Union) and member of many Polish literary organizations. Przeczek also translated Czech, Slovak and Sorbian poetry to Polish and Polish poetry into Czech.

During the Prague Spring of 1968, Przeczek supported the reformist wing of the Communist Party of Czechoslovakia. His stances led to ban of his works from 1969 to 1989 in Czechoslovakia. His books were therefore published mainly in Poland.

Works

Poetry
 Czarna calizna (1978)
 Wpisane w Beskid (1980)
 Śmierć pomysłu poetyckiego (1981)
 Szumne podszepty (1982)
 Księga Urodzaju (1986)
 Nauka wierności (1986)
 Tercet (1986)
 Przeczucie kształtu (1989)
 Notatnik liryczny (1990)
 Rękopisy nie płoną (1990)
 Promlčený počet štěstí (1991)
 Dym za paznokciami (1992)
 Na ubitej ziemi (1994)
 Mapa białych plam (1995)
 Małe nocne modlitwy (1996)
 Intimní bedeker (1998)
 Smak wyciszenia (1999)
 Stoletý kalendář (2001)

Prose
 Skrzyżowanie (1969) (together with Władysław Sikora)
 Břečťan a jiné strašidelné povídky (1992)
 Kazinkowe granie (1994)
 Bienále pivní pěny (1996)

References

Further reading
 
 Profile of Wilhelm Przeczek in Zwrot 7/2007: 42-43.
 
 

1936 births
2006 deaths
Writers from Karviná
Polish people from Zaolzie
Polish translators
20th-century Polish poets
20th-century translators
Polish male poets
20th-century Polish male writers
20th-century Polish journalists